Santo Antônio do Pinhal is a municipality in the state of São Paulo in Brazil. It is part of the Metropolitan Region of Vale do Paraíba e Litoral Norte. The population is 6,827 (2020 est.) in an area of 133.01 km². The elevation is 1,080 m (3543 ft). It is situated near Campos do Jordão, some 150 km away from São Paulo.

The municipality contains 34% of the  Sapucaí Mirim Environmental Protection Area, created in 1998.

References

External links
 Municipal Government
 Real Estate Agency

Municipalities in São Paulo (state)